Tatman Run is a stream in the U.S. state of Pennsylvania.

Tatman Run was named after Joseph Tatman, a pioneer settler.

References

Rivers of Pennsylvania
Rivers of Huntingdon County, Pennsylvania